Orange Blossom is a French band that plays a mix of electronic and world music. 

The band was formed in Nantes in 1993 with Pierre-Jean Chabot (known as PJ Chabot) on violin and Jean-Christophe Waechter (known as Jay C.) on percussions and vocals.  The band is named after a 1920s train immortalised by Ervin Rouse and Chubby Wise's fiddle tune "Orange Blossom Special."
In 1994, Éric (organ) joined the band and a first audio tape was recorded in September.
In 1995 the band stabilized with the arrival of Carlos Robles Arenas on drums, djembé, and sample, and the departure of Éric.
Their first disc, Orange Blossom, came out in 1997 on the Prikosnovénie label, selling 15,000 copies.

Before their second album came out, the group was influenced by ethnic and traditional music. They met and collaborated with several non-French artists, like Ivorian percussion group Yelemba D'Abidjan and Egyptian group Ganoub. They toured in Egypt, France, and Belgium. Vocalist Jay C. left the band in 2000 and created Prajña. In 2002, percussionist Mathias Vaguenez and vocalist Leïla Bounous joined the group. The album Everything Must Change came out in 2005 on the Bonsaï Music label.

Carlos Robles Arenas is Mexican. Leïla Bounous is part Algerian, part Moorish, part Breton. She later left and Hend El Rawy from Egypt, joined the band in 2014.

Their third album, Under the Shade of Violets came out in 2014. Most of the band's songs are sung in Arabic.

Discography 
 Self-produced 6 title audio tape (1994)
 Prayer
 Child & Doll
 Speedman
 Welcome In My Brain
 Jesse's Grandfather
 Red Orange Blossom
 Self-produced 4 title audio tape (1996)
 Ray
 Die Stadt
 Bali
 My Village
 Orange Blossom (1997)
 Anaconda Girl
 Maria Del Sol
 Bata
 N.
 Die Stadt
 I'm Dying
 Trinity
 Everything Must Change (2005) (SNEP FRANCE: Peak #141)
 Maldito (Cursed)
 Habibi (My Darling)
 Cheft El Khof (I've Seen Fear)
 Desert Dub
 Nafsi (My Soul)
 Souffrance
 Blama
 Yazaman (A Long Time Ago)
 Denya (Life)
 Bendimina (My Heart Is Aching)
 Ayoub (hidden track)
 Under the Shade of Violets (2014) (SNEP FRANCE: Peak #84)
 Ommaty  
 Lost  
 Ya Sîdî 
 Pitcha  
 Jerusalem 
 Maria 
 Goodbye Kô  
 Mexico  
 The Nubian  
 Black Box 
 Pink Ma  
 Aqua

Notes

External links 
 Orange Blossom on Myspace
 Prikosnovénie (French, audio samples)
 Bonsaï Music (French, audio samples)
 

French electronic music groups
Techno music groups
French world music groups
French dub musical groups
Prikosnovénie artists
Wrasse Records artists
Musical groups established in the 1990s
Musical groups from Pays de la Loire